The lac à la Chasse is a freshwater body of the watershed of the rivière à la Chasse, located in the territory of the city of Baie-Comeau, in the Manicouagan Regional County Municipality, in the administrative region of Côte-Nord, in the province of Quebec, Canada.

The east side of Lac à la Chasse is served by Comeau Boulevard (route 138) and the southwest side by the Trans-Quebec-Labrador route (route 389).

Forestry is the main economic activity around the lake.

Geography 
Lac à la Chasse is located in the eastern part of the territory of the town of Baie-Comeau. This deformed lake is crossed to the south by the rivière à la Chasse. This lake has a dam erected at its mouth. This lake is divided into two parts separated by a strait of a hundred meters in its center, because of a peninsula attached to the eastern shore and stretching for about  towards the west and another peninsula attached to the west bank.

The northern part has three main bays, two of which stretch north. The southern part has seven main bays.

Toponymy 
The toponym "lac à la Chasse" was formalized on December 5, 1968 at the Place Names Bank of the Commission de toponymie du Québec.

See also 

 Manicouagan Regional County Municipality
 Baie-Comeau, a city
 Rivière à la Chasse, a stream
 Gulf of St. Lawrence, a stream
 List of rivers of Quebec

References 

Lakes of Côte-Nord
Manicouagan Regional County Municipality